La Reine can refer to

Organizations
 Régiment de La Reine, a regiment of the French Army of the Ancien Régime

Places
 La Reine, Quebec, a municipality in Quebec, Canada
 La Reine, a populated place in the commune of Saint-Priest-des-Champs, Puy-de-Dôme, France
 La Reine, U.S. Virgin Islands

See also 
 Reine, Norway
 "Reine" (song)